Founded in 2010, ADISA Certification Limited (formerly called the Asset Disposal and Information Security Alliance) is a certification body for companies who provide IT Asset Disposal services.

ASIDA manages the ADISA Asset Recovery Standard. The audit team, based in Hertfordshire, has performed over 500 audits in 17 counties since its inception. In July 2021, the ADISA ICT Asset Recovery Standard 8.0 was formally approved by the UK Information Commissioner's Office as a UK GDPR Certification Scheme.

In 2019, ADISA launched the ADISA Research Centre (ARC). ARC delivers product certification schemes for software and hardware data sanitization tools. The ADISA Product Claims and Product Assurance Schemes are different levels of product testing for data sanitization tools.  

The Product Claims Test (PCT) scientifically evaluates the claim behind the data sanitization capabilities of a software or hardware device to determine its validity.
The Product Assurance Test offers a higher level of assurance than the PCT; it requires a larger sample size to be forensically analyzed and measures the vendors of the software or hardware device against a range of requirements.

ADISA won the 2020 Computer Security Magazine "One to Watch" award to follow up on previous wins including 2019 "Computer Security Compliance Company of the year" award and Training Provider of the Year (2015). The ADISA Standard is recognized as an industry standard of merit by the UK Defence Infosec Product Co-Operation Group (DIPCOG) and listed on the National Cyber Security Centre's guidance for companies when disposing of IT assets.

ADISA owns a YouTube channel called "ADISA Media Centre" where they provide information from the group in various formats.

See also
Computer recycling
Data remanence
Electronic waste
Sanitization (classified information)

References

Electronic waste
Information technology organisations based in the United Kingdom
Organisations based in the City of Westminster
Waste organizations